Wolcen: Lords of Mayhem is an action role-playing dungeon crawler video game developed and published by Wolcen Studios and released for Windows in February 2020. The dark fantasy-themed game progresses across a three-act storyline in which players explore procedurally-generated maps to battle hordes of monsters and collect valuable loot.

The player is a member of the Army of the Purifiers along with two childhood friends, and has become part of operation Dawnbane to retaliate against the Brotherhood of Dawn which has attacked a mysterious fortress.

Reception

Wolcen: Lords of Mayhem received mixed reviews. As of June 2021, on Metacritic it has a score of 60 out of 100 based on reviews from 25 critics. It has been praised for appealing to veteran players of the action RPG dungeon crawler genre, while providing less restrictive character customization and a focus on high-quality graphics. Negative reviews largely cite major bugs on release and its unrealized potential due to derivative gameplay.

IGN gave it a "mediocre" 5 out of 10 and wrote: "Once its major bugs are resolved, Wolcen's clever ideas could let it compete with the heavyweights of the action RPG genre. For now, though, too much of the mayhem is caused by bugs to recommend it."

Awards

Nominations 

 Game Audio Network Guild Awards 2021: Best Music for an Indie Game
 Game Audio Network Guild Awards 2021: Best Audio for an Indie Game
 Game Audio Network Guild Awards 2021: Best Sound Design for an Indie Game
 NAVGTR Awards 2021 : Outstanding Original Dramatic Score, New IP
 NAVGTR Awards 2021 : Best Lighting/Texturing
 Movie Music UK Awards 2021 : Best Original Score for a Video Game
 TIGA Awards 2021: Best Audio Design
 Pegase 2021 : Meilleur Univers Sonore
 Pegase 2021 : Meilleur Premier jeu vidéo
 Jerry Goldsmith Awards 2023 : Best Original Score for a Videogame

References

External links
 Official Website
 Wolcen: Lords of Mayhem at Steam

2020 video games
Action role-playing video games
Fantasy video games
Role-playing video games
Video games developed in the United States
Video games with isometric graphics
Video games featuring female protagonists
Video games using procedural generation
Windows games
Windows-only games
Single-player video games
Kickstarter-funded video games
CryEngine games